Perils of the Rail is a 1925 silent film action film directed by J. P. McGowan and starring Helen Holmes. IMDb trivia has the film being shot in 1924 but not released until 1925. The film survives as it is on DVD and a copy viewed by the AFI. The Library of Congress online source indicates "no holdings" or that it is lost.

Cast
Helen Holmes - Helen Martin
Edward Hearn - Jack Hathaway
Wilfrid North - Pepper Martin
Lloyd Whitlock - Barker, The Claims Agent
Dick Rush - The Manager of the Great Western Smelter
Dan Crimmins - 'Slippery' McGee
Norma Wills - Slippery's Wife
J. P. McGowan - Barker's Accomplice at Smelter Junction
Rex - Himself, Rex A Dog

References

External links
Perils of the Rail at IMDb.com

1925 films
American silent feature films
Rail transport films
Films directed by J. P. McGowan
American black-and-white films
American action films
1920s action films
Preferred Pictures films
1920s American films